HMS Venturous (D87) was a V-class destroyer of the British Royal Navy that saw service in World War I.

Construction and commissioning

Venturous, the first Royal Navy ship of the name, was ordered in July 1916. She was laid down on 9 October 1916 by William Denny and Brothers at Dumbarton, Scotland, and, per a British Admiralty order of 12 January 1917, fitted to carry 60 naval mines for operations as a minelayer. She was launched on 21 September 1917 and completed on 29 November 1917. Her original pennant number, F30, assigned in 1917, became F21 in January 1918 and F87 in September 1918 before finally changing to D87.

Service history

German forces did not interfere with the operations. She also participated with Abdiel, Tarpon, Telemachus, and Vanquisher in the second operation to lay Sinker mines on 22 August 1918, in the North Sea off Flanders about 17 nautical miles (31 km) north of Zeebrugge, Belgium, supported by Royal Air Force aircraft which patrolled to prevent German aerial observation of the operation.

The entire flotilla was transferred to the Reserve Fleet on 4 April 1922 and laid up at Rosyth, Scotland, with reduced crews, but it was recommissioned on 8 April 1925 and renumbered as the 7th Destroyer Flotilla.

Final disposition
In 1936, Cunard White Star retired Majestic and sold her to Thos. W. Ward for scrapping, but because of legal requirements imposed under the agreement transferring Majestic to the United Kingdom as a war prize, the British government instead took control of Majestic and assigned her to the Royal Navy. To pay Thos. W. Ward for Majestic, the Royal Navy agreed to transfer 24 old destroyers with a combined scrap value equivalent to that of Majestic to Thos W Ward for scrapping. Venturous was among these, and her transfer to Thos W Ward for scrapping took place on 24 August 1936. She was scrapped at Inverkeithing, Scotland.

Notes

Bibliography
 
 
 
 
 
 
 

 

V and W-class destroyers of the Royal Navy
Ships built on the River Clyde
1917 ships
World War I destroyers of the United Kingdom